Timotei Cipariu (February 21, 1805, Pánád, Kis-Küküllő County–September 3, 1887, Balázsfalva, Alsó-Fehér County) was a Romanian Greek Catholic cleric and academic. He was one of the founding members of the Romanian Academy.

References 

1805 births
1887 deaths
People from Alba County
Romanians in Hungary
Members of the Austrian House of Deputies (1861–1867)
19th-century Romanian people
Founding members of the Romanian Academy